Lily Pond Avenue is a relatively short primary artery in the South Beach, Arrochar, Concord, and Shore Acres neighborhoods in the New York City borough of Staten Island.

Route description
Lily Pond Avenue is the middle leg of Staten Island's coastal eastern corridor, possessing the same route as School Road and Father Capodanno Boulevard. Important intersections include Tompkins Avenue, Narrows Road, Major Avenue, and McClean Avenue. Lily Pond Avenue passes underneath the Staten Island Expressway at the foot of the Verrazano-Narrows Bridge. Landmarks include the Verrazano-Narrows Bridge Memorial.

Toll plaza reconstruction
The Lily Pond toll plaza reconstruction project was notable for going far over the timeline for its completion in 2008. The project was started in 2006, but had taken longer than originally planned. States Senator Diane Savino and Member of the Assembly Michael Cusick criticized the Metropolitan Transportation Authority for the construction delays.  The project was finally expected to be completed in 2014.  There were concerns as early as 1994 about the huge mass of concrete used in the Lily Pond Bridge, which is one of three bridges or passes on the Staten Island side of the Verrazano-Narrows Bridge.

Since the completion of the project, the toll plaza has been demolished and replaced with an electronic toll collection gantry.

Points of interest
A busy thoroughfare, Lily Pond Avenue has been the scene of at least one fatal motorcycle accident in 2012, and a roadside memorial was set up on the side of that road.

A small, 35-bed nursing home is located on Lily Pond Avenue.

Transportation 
Because of the easy access the artery provides to the Verrazano-Narrows Bridge amongst other destinations, MTA Regional Bus Operations runs the following public bus routes along the avenue:
 The / along Lily Pond Avenue's entire route.
 The  from the Staten Island Expressway to McClean Avenue.
 The  from the Staten Island Expressway to Father Capodanno Boulevard.

The New York City Marathon directs buses and private vehicles to Lily Pond Avenue, which is just outside the main staging area for the start of the famous foot race.  The street is then closed to through traffic.

The City of New York has a designated bicycle lane on Lily Pond Avenue.

Major intersections

In popular culture
Lily Pond Avenue is mentioned in several police procedural novels: in F. P. Lione's The Crossroads, the second volume of the Midtown Blues series, Lione's Skells: A Novel, the third volume of the Midtown Blues series, and Jamise L. Dames's Pushing Up Daisies: A Novel,

References

Streets in Staten Island